The Last of the Haussmans is a play by Stephen Beresford, set in Devon, and about three generations of the Haussman family.

Productions 
The Last of the Haussmans opened in the Lyttleton at the National Theatre on 19 June 2012, following previews from 12 June. It had its final performance on 11 October 2012. The production was broadcast as part of National Theatre Live Helen McCrory was nominated for the Laurence Olivier Award for Best Actress in a Supporting Role for her performance as Libby.

Cast and characters

References 

2012 plays